A silo is a structure for storing bulk materials.

Silo or SILO may refer to:

Arts and entertainment
 Silo (film), a 2021 American thriller drama film
 Silo (series), science fiction novellas by Hugh Howey
 Silo (TV series), an upcoming streaming television series adapted from the novellas
 a title character of Sam and Silo, an American comic strip from 1977 to 2017

Computing
 Data silo, a type of information silo
 SILO (boot loader), used in Linux
 Silo (library), a data file format and library for scientific model data
 Silo (software), a 3D modeling software

People
 Abronius Silo, 1st century BC Latin poet
 Quintus Poppaedius Silo (died 88 BC), leader of the Italian tribe of the Marsi 
 Silo of Asturias, king of Asturias (in Spain) from 774 to 783
 Mario Rodríguez Cobos (1938–2010), Argentine writer and founder of the Humanist Movement also known as Silo
 Adam Silo (1674–1760), Dutch painter
 Susan Silo (born 1942), American actress
 Talal Silo (born 1965), Syrian Turkmen defector

Places
 Silo, Oklahoma, a town in the United States
 Šilo, a village in Croatia
 Silo Canal, Brandenburg, Germany
 The Silo (Copenhagen), Denmark

Businesses and companies
 Silo (store), an American chain of retail electronics stores
 Silo Theatre, a New Zealand theatre production company
 The Silo, a Lesotho agricultural newspaper

Zoology
 Silo (insect), a genus of insects in the order Trichoptera
 Roy and Silo, a chinstrap penguin pair

Other uses
 Silo High School, Durant, Oklahoma, United States
 School Infrastructure Local Option, a sales tax in Iowa, United States
 Missile silo, an underground missile launching facility
 Information silo, a management system incapable of reciprocal operation with other, related management systems
 Silastic silo, used to treat abdominal wall defects

See also
 
 Shilo (disambiguation)